Anaavaranam is a 1976 Indian Malayalam film, directed by A. Vincent and produced by K. J. Joseph. The film stars T. Chandran nair, Sathar, Janardanan and Rani Chandra in the lead roles. The film has musical score by G. Devarajan.

Cast
 
 T. Chandran nair 
Sathar
Janardanan 
Rani Chandra 
Shylaja
Usharani

Soundtrack
The music was composed by G. Devarajan and the lyrics were written by Vayalar.

References

External links
 

1976 films
1970s Malayalam-language films
Films directed by A. Vincent